Book censorship in India has existed at least since the British period, and several books remain banned by the central and state governments.

Books criticizing major religions of India, as well as books supposedly portraying national figures including Gandhi and Nehru in a bad light continue to remain banned.

History

British period

Post Independence 
During the 1960s, following the Sino-Indian war, Chinese books and magazines were banned. After protests by Muslims and a petition by Syed Shahabuddin to the Rajiv Gandhi government, The Satanic Verses was banned in 1988, with India becoming the first country to ban the book.

Topics

Religious 
Many books in India are or were banned for disagreeing with Islam and Hinduism's teachings.

Political 
Many books in India were banned for criticizing India and it's government or political systems.

Historical 
Books were banned for criticizing Gandhi and other important Indian historical figures.

Obscenity 
The Scented Garden: Anthropology of the Sex Life in the Levant was banned due to sexually explicit content.

List of banned books

See also 

 The Calcutta Quran Petition

References 

Book censorship in India